The Roman Catholic Diocese of Włocławek, until the 20th century known as the Roman Catholic Diocese of Kujawy, is a suffragan diocese of the Latin Church of the Roman Catholic Church in the Ecclesiastical province of the Metropolitan Roman Catholic Archdiocese of Gniezno in western Poland.

The bishops' seat is Włocławek Cathedral, also a minor basilica:  in the city of Włocławek, in Kujawsko-Pomorskie. The diocese has two more Minor Basilicas: 
 Basilica of Our Lady of Licheń, in Licheń Stary, Wielkopolskie
 , in Zduńska Wola, Łódzkie.

The diocese is currently headed by Bishop Krzysztof Jakub Wętkowski, appointed in 2021.

History 
 We disregard the presumably merely-legendary precursor(?) Diocese of Kruszwica (966–1156)
 Established in 1015 as Diocese of Kujawy–Pomorze (i.e. Kujawy–Pomerania) / Kruszwicka (Polish) / Cuiavia–Pomerania (Curiate Italian), on territory split off from the suppressed Diocese of Kolberg (Kołobrzeg)
 Renamed in 1148 as Diocese of Kujawy–Pomorze / Cuiavia–Pomerania (Italiano) / since ca. 1124/26 called Włocławek after its see
 Theological seminary in Włocławek founded in 1569 by Bishop Stanisław Karnkowski as one of the oldest seminaries in Poland.
 Gained territory in 1633 from the Diocese of Płock
 Renamed on 30 June 1818 as Diocese of Kujawy–Kaliska / Cuiavia–Kalisz (Italiano), having lost territories to its Metropolitan the Archdiocese of Gniezno, to Diocese of Poznań, to Diocese of Wrocław and to Diocese of Płock.
 Renamed on 28 Oct 1925 after its see as Diocese of Włocławek / Wladislavia / Vladislavien(sis) (Latin adjective)
 During the German occupation of Poland (World War II), the Germans murdered 249 priests from the Diocese of Włocławek, including the Auxiliary Bishop of Włocławek Michał Kozal, closed down the cathedral, and robbed the precious historical collections of the diocese of Włocławek.
 Lost territory on 25 March 1992 to establish the Diocese of Kalisz.
 It enjoyed Papal visits from the Polish Pope John Paul II in June 1991 and June 1999.
 In 2018 the Włocławek Cathedral was listed by the President of Poland as a Historic Monument of Poland.

Statistics 
As per 2014, it pastorally served 762,750 Catholics (99.1% of 769,937 total) on 8,824 km² in 232 parishes and 132 missions with 568 priests (481 diocesan, 87 religious), 452 lay religious (124 brothers, 328 sisters) and 60 seminarians.

Episcopal ordinaries
(all Roman rite)
Imported from List of bishops of Kujawy (Włocławek) and amended; sources contradict often, notably in the first centuries:

Suffragan Bishops of Kujawy–Pomorze
(Kujawy–Pomerania, Włocławek; 1133–1818)
 Swidger (1128? – 1151;? attested from 1133)
 Onold (1151? – 1160?; attested 1161–1180)
 Rudger (1160? – 1170?)
 Werner (1170? – 1178? or 1148–1156?)
 Wunelf (1178?–1190?)
 Stefan (attested 1187–1198–)
 Ogerius (1197/1203; attested 1206?–1212)
 Bartha (1203–1215; attested 1213–1220)
 Michał (1215 – 1256 or 1222–1252)
 Wolimir (1256–1271 or 1252–1275) 
 Albierz/Wojciech (1271?/1275? – 1283)
1284–1300 – Wiesław
1300–1323 – Gerward
1324–1364 – Maciej z Gołańczy
1364–1383 – Zbylut z Wąsosza
1383–1383 – Trojan
1384–1389 – Jan Kropidło
1389–1398 – Henry VIII of Legnica (Henryk VIII legnicki)
1399–1402 – Mikołaj Kurowski
1402–1421 – Jan Kropidło (again)
1421–1427 – Jan Pella
1427–1433 – Jan Szafraniec
1433–1449 – Władysław Oporowski
1449–1450 – Mikołaj Lasocki
1450–1463 – Jan Gruszczyński
1463–1464 – Jan Lutek
1464–1472 – Jakub z Sienna
1473–1480 – Zbigniew Oleśnicki
1481–1483 – Andrzej Oporowski
1484–1493 – Piotr Moszyński
1494–1503 – Krzesław Kurozwęcki
1503–1513 – Wincenty Przerębski
1513–1531 – Maciej Drzewicki
1531–1538 – Jan Karnkowski
1538–1542 – Łukasz II Górka
1542–1546 – Mikołaj Dzierzgowski
1546–1551 – Andrzej Zebrzydowski
1551–1557 – Jan Drohojowskii
1557–1565 – Jakub Uchański
1565–1567 – Mikołaj Wolski
1567–1580 – Stanisław Karnkowski
1581–1600 – Hieronim Rozrażewski
1600–1603 – Jan Tarnowski
1603–1607 – Piotr Tylicki
1608–1608 – Wojciech Baranowski
1608–1610 – Maciej Pstrokoński
1610–1616 – Wawrzyniec Gembicki
1616–1622 – Paweł Wołucki
1622–1631 – Andrzej Lipski
1631–1642 – Maciej Łubieński
1642–1654 – Mikołaj Wojciech Gniewosz
1654–1673 – Kazimierz Florian Czartoryski
1674–1675 – Jan Gembicki
1675–1680 – Stanisław Sarnowski
1680–1691 – Bonawentura Madaliński
1691–1700 – Stanisław Dąmbski
1700–1705 – Stanisław Szembek
1705–1720 – Felicjan Konstanty Szaniawski
1720–1735 – Krzysztof Antoni Szembek
1735–1741 – Adam Stanisław Grabowski
1741–1751 – Walenty Aleksander Czapski
1751–1763 – Antoni Sebastian Dembowski
1763–1776 – Antoni Kazimierz Ostrowski
1777–1806 – Józef Ignacy Rybiński
1806–1815 – vacant
1815–1818 – Archbishop Franciszek Skarbek von Malczewski

Suffragan Bishops of Kujawy–Kaliska
1818–1822 – Andrzej Wołłowicz
1822–1831 – Józef Szczepan Koźmian
1831–1836 – vacant
1836–1850 – Walenty Maciej Bończa
1850–1856 – vacant
1856–1867 – Jan Michał Marszewski
1867–1876 – vacancy
1876–1883 – Wincenty Teofil Popiel
1883–1902 – Aleksander Kazimierz Bereśniewicz
 Stanisław Kazimierz Zdzitowiecki (1902–1925 see below)

Suffragan Bishops of Włocławek 
 Stanisław Kazimierz Zdzitowiecki (see above 1925–1927 –)
1927–1928 – Władysław Paweł Krynicki
1928–1951 – Karol Mieczysław Radoński
1951–1968 – Antoni Pawłowski
1969–1986 – Jan Zaręba
1987–1992 – Henryk Muszyński
1992–2003 – Bronisław Dembowski
2003–2021 – Wiesław Mering 
2021–...  – Krzysztof Jakub Wętkowski

Auxiliary bishops 
 1514–? – Aleksander Myszczynski
 1581–1585 – Maciej Wielicki
 1597–1617 – Franciszek Lanczki
 1617–1632 – Balthasar Miaskowski
 1634–1638 – Krzysztof Charbicki
 1639–1643 – Wenceslaus Paprocki
 1643–1652 – Piotr Mieszkowski (starszy)
 1652–? – Walerian Wilczogórski
 1653–1677 – Stanisław Domaniewski
 1678–1696 – Piotr Mieszkowski (młodszy)
 1695–? – Andreas Albinowski
 1709–1723 – Wojciech Ignacy Bardziński
 1725–1736 – Franciszek Antoni Kobielski
 1737–1739 – Aleksander Działyński
 1740–1759 – Franciszek Kanigowski
 1759–1788 – Jan Dembowski
 1766–1775 – Cyprian Kazimierz von Wolicki
 1775–1781 – Maciej Grzegorz Garnysz
1781–1799 – Ludwik Stanisław Górski
 1789–1793 – Marcin Chyczewski
1794–1819 – Feliks Łukasz Lewiński
 1819–1825 – Józef Marcelin Dzięcielski
 1838–1844 – Józef Joachim Goldtmann
 1844–1861 – Taddeo Łubieński
1884–1898 – Carlo Pollner
 1884–1889 – Henryk Piotr Kossowski
 1918–1938 – Wojciech Stanisław Owczarek
 1918–1927 – Władysław Paweł Krynicki, Appointed Bishop of Włocławek
 1939–1943 – Bl. Michaël Kozal
1962–1979 – Kazimierz Jan Majdański
 1946–1972 – Franciszek Salezy Korszyński
1963–1969 – Jan Zareba, Appointed Bishop of Włocławek
 1973–1997 – Czeslaw Lewandowski
 1981–2003 – Roman Andrzejewski
 1999–2020 – Stanisław Gębicki

See also 
 List of Catholic dioceses in Poland
 Parish of the Holiest Saviour, Włocławek
 Roman Catholicism in Poland

References

Sources and external links 
 GCatholic.org, with Google map & satellite photo - data for all sections
 Catholic Hierarchy
  Diocese website
 Jan Fijałek: Ustalenie chronologii biskupów włocławskich, Kraków 1894

12th-century establishments in Poland
Wloclawek
Wloclawek
Włocławek